Madelia may refer to:
 Madelia (horse), a French Thoroughbred racehorse
 Madelia, Minnesota, United States
 Madelia Township, Watonwan County, Minnesota, United States